Nicolò Cattaneo Della Volta (Genoa, 18 July 1679 - Genoa, 5 July 1751) was the 153rd Doge of the Republic of Genoa and king of Corsica.

Biography 
On February 7, 1736 he was elected the new Doge the Republic as new doge, the one hundred and eighth in two-year succession and the one hundred and fifty-third in republican history. As boge he was also invested with the related biennial office of King of Corsica. His Dogate was inevitably dominated by the Corsican Crisis. His two-year mandate ended, on February 7, 1738, he assumed the position of deputy of the Tax office of the Republic of Genoa. 
Nicolò Cattaneo Della Volta died in Genoa on 5 July 1751.

See also 

 Republic of Genoa
 Doge of Genoa

References 

18th-century Doges of Genoa
1679 births
1751 deaths